Guillotine is the debut studio album by Australian indie rock band British India, released on 30 June 2007. It reached #4 on the AIR Charts July 2007 and was selected as Triple J's Feature Album. At the J Awards of 2007, the album was nominated for Australian Album of the Year.

Also that year it won the AIR Award for "Best Independent Release."

Track listing

Release history

References

External links
Watch "Black & White Radio" on YouTube
Watch "Tie Up My Hands" on YouTube
Watch "Run the Red Light" on YouTube

2007 debut albums
British India (band) albums
Shock Records albums
Albums produced by Harry Vanda